Glaucocharis utsugii is a moth in the family Crambidae. It was described by Sasaki in 2007. It is found in Japan, where it has been recorded from Okinawa Island.

References

Diptychophorini
Moths described in 2007